Gongyi railway station is a station on the Longhai railway in Gongyi, Zhengzhou, Henan.

History
The station was established in 1908 together with the Kaifeng-Luoyang section of Longhai railway.

See also
 Gongyi South railway station

References

Railway stations in Henan
Railway stations in Zhengzhou
Stations on the Longhai Railway
Railway stations in China opened in 1908